Enophrys diceraus, the antlered sculpin, is a species of marine ray-finned fish belonging to the family Cottidae, the typical sculpins. This species occurs in the northern Pacific Ocean.

Taxonomy
Enophrys diceraus was first formally described as Cottus diceraus in 1787 by the German zoologist Peter Simon Pallas with its type locality given as Kamchatka. In 1829 the French zoologist Georges Cuvier described Cottus claviger, also from Kamchatka, and in 1839 the English zoologist William John Swainson proposed a new monospecific genus for Cuvier's species which he called Enophrys. Later Cuvier's C. claviger was found to be a synonym of Pallas's C, diceraus but it is the type species of the genus Enophrys. The specific name diceraus means "two-horned" a reference to the preopercular spines, one on each side of the head.

Description
Enophrys diceraus has a long straight spine on the upper cheek, the preopercular spine which reaches past the operculum and has between 2 and 8 ancillary spines, or spinules. The lacrimal bone has a bifurcated flap which extends down over the maxilla. There are 2 dorsal fins which are supported by between 7 or 8 spines and between 12 and 15 soft rays while the anal fin has 10 or 13 soft rays. There are 2 well developed bony ridges on the top of the head. The large lateral line scales are plate like and have 1 or 2 keels and a rough rera edge.

Distribution and habitat
Enophrys diceraus is found in the subarctic part of the Pacific Ocean from the northern Sea of Japan to Point Hope in Alaska and in the Chukchi Sea to Amchitka Island in the Aleutians.

Biology
They form aggregations for feeding and spawning in the south of their range in Peter the Great Bay and in central parts along the mainland Asian coast and off the southern part of Sakhalin. These do not occur in the northern part of their range.

References

Fish described in 1787
Taxa named by Peter Simon Pallas
diceraus